The Targa Florio was a public road endurance automobile race held in the mountains of Sicily near the island's capital of Palermo. Founded in 1906, it was the oldest sports car racing event, part of the World Sportscar Championship between 1955 and 1973.

After 1973, it was a national sports car event until it was discontinued in 1977 due to safety concerns. It has since been run as Targa Florio Rally, a rallying event, and is part of the Italian Rally Championship.

History 

The race was created in 1906 by the wealthy pioneer race driver and automobile enthusiast, Vincenzo Florio, who had started the Coppa Florio race in Brescia, Lombardy in 1900. The Targa also claimed to be a worldly event not to be missed. Renowned artists, such as Alexandre Charpentier and Leonardo Bistolfi, were commissioned to design medals. A magazine was initiated, Rapiditas, which aimed to enhance, with graphic and photographic reproductions of the race, the myth of the car and the typical character of modern life, speed.

One of the toughest competitions in Europe, the first Targa Florio covered 3 laps equalling  through winding bends and multiple hairpin curves on treacherous mountain roads, at heights where severe changes in climate frequently occurred. Alessandro Cagno won the inaugural 1906 race in nine hours, averaging 30 miles per hour (50 km/h).

By the early to mid-1920s, the Targa Florio course had been shortened to 67 miles (108 km) and had become one of Europe's most important races, as neither the 24 Hours of Le Mans nor the Mille Miglia had been established yet. Grand Prix races were still isolated events, not a series like today's F1.

The wins of Mercedes (not yet merged with Benz) in the 1920s made a big impression in Germany, especially that of German Christian Werner in 1924, as he was the first non-Italian winner since 1920. Rudolf Caracciola repeated a similar upset win at the Mille Miglia a couple of years later. In 1926, Eliska Junkova, one of the great female drivers in Grand Prix motor racing history, became the first woman to ever compete in the race. The 1931 race saw a one-off return to the Grande course after roads and bridges specifically unique to the Medio course near Polizzi Generosa had been destroyed by landslides during severe rainstorms; the 1932 course saw the first use of the Piccolo course after a road connecting Caltavuturo and Collesano was constructed on the direct orders of Benito Mussolini himself by request of Florio.

In 1953, the FIA World Sportscar Championship was introduced. The Targa became part of it in 1955, when Mercedes had to win 1-2 with the Mercedes-Benz 300 SLR in order to beat Ferrari for the title. They had missed the first two of the 6 events, Buenos Aires and the 12 Hours of Sebring, where Ferrari, Jaguar, Maserati and Porsche scored. Mercedes appeared at and won in the Mille Miglia, then pulled out of Le Mans as a sign of respect for the victims of the 1955 Le Mans disaster, but won the Tourist Trophy at Dundrod. Stirling Moss/Peter Collins and Juan Manuel Fangio/Karl Kling finished minutes ahead of the best Ferrari and secured the title.

Course variants

Several versions of the track were used. It started with a single lap of a  circuit from 1906-1911 and 1931. From 1951-1958, the long coastal island tour variant was used for a separate event called the Giro di Sicilia (Lap of Sicily).

The start and finish took place at Cerda. The counter-clockwise lap lead from Caltavuturo and Collesano from an altitude over  down to sea level, where the cars raced from Campofelice di Roccella on the Buonfornello straight along the coast, a straight that was even longer than the Mulsanne Straight at the Circuit de la Sarthe in Le Mans. The longest version of the circuit went south through Caltavuturo (whereas the shortest version of the open-road circuit went east just before entry into Caltavuturo, through a mountainous section directly to Collesano) through an extended route through elevation changes, and climbed uphill through the nearby towns of Castellana, Sottana, Madonnuzza and Miranti, twisting around mountains up to the highest point-  at Geraci Siculo, dropping down  into Castelbuono, twisting around more mountains and passing through Isnello and the village of Mongerrati and then rejoined the most recent version of the track at Collesano. The second version of the track also went south through Caltavuturo and took a shortcut starting right before Castellana to Collesano via the town of Polizzi Generosa. There was a closed circuit called Favorita Park in the Sicilian capital of Palermo used from 1937-1940. All the roads used for all the variations of the circuits are still in use today. Originally a narrow 2-lane country road, the Buonfornello straight became a lot wider in the late 1960's thanks to the development of the Autostrade motorways all over Italy.

The challenge of the Targa was unprecedented in its difficulty and the driving experience of any of the course variants was unlike any other circuit in the world other than perhaps that of the Nurburgring in Germany and (for motorcycles) the much faster but similar Snaefell Mountain Course on the Isle of Man. All of the variants had 18 to 23 corners per mile (11 to 14 corners per kilometer)- the original Grande  circuit had in the realm of 2,000 corners per lap, the  Medio had about 1,300-1,400 corners per lap and the final iteration of the course, the  Piccolo circuit had about 800-900 corners per lap. To put that into perspective, most purpose-built circuits have between 12 and 18 corners, and the longest purpose-built circuit in the world, the 13-mile Nurburgring, has about 180 corners. So learning any of the Targa Florio courses was extremely difficult and required, like most long circuits, at least 60 laps to learn the course- and unlike the purpose-built Nurburgring, the course had to be learned properly in public traffic, and one lap of even the Piccolo course would take about an hour to do in a road car- if there was little to no traffic. To even finish this punishing race required a very reliable car- and it being a slow, twisty circuit it was very hard on the gearbox, brakes and the suspension of a car. Some manufacturers and entrants, particularly non-Italian ones would sometimes outright skip the Targa because of the difficulty of learning the layout and were unsure if their cars could stand the brutal pace there.

Lap speeds
Like a rally event (and events like the Isle of Man TT and the Mille Miglia), the race cars were started one by one every 15 seconds for a time trial, as a start from a full grid was not possible on the tight and twisty roads.

Although the public road circuit used for the Targa was extremely challenging- it was a very different kind of circuit and race from any other race on the sportscar calendar. All of the circuit variations of the Targa had so many corners that lap speeds at the Targa never went higher than 80 mph (128 km/h), as opposed to Le Mans in France, where cars would average 150+ mph (240+ km/h) or the Nürburgring, where cars would average 110 mph (176 km/h). Helmut Marko set the lap record in 1972 in an Alfa Romeo 33TT3 at 33 min 41 s at an average of  during an epic charge where he made up 2 minutes on Arturo Merzario and his Ferrari 312PB.

Due to the track's length, drivers practised in the week before the race in public traffic, often with their race cars fitted with license plates. Porsche factory drivers even had to watch onboard videos, a sickening experience for some. The fastest completion around the short version of the island tour was done by Giovanni "Ernesto" Ceirano in a SCAT at the 1914 race, completed in 16 hours, 51 minutes and 31.6 seconds from May 24–25, 1914.

1970s, safety and demise 
In the late 1960s and early 1970s, race cars with up to 600 hp (450 kW) such as Nino Vaccarella's Ferrari 512S raced through small mountain villages while spectators sat or stood right next to, or even on, the road. Porsche, on the other hand, did not race its big and powerful Porsche 917, but rather the smaller and nimble Porsche 908/03 Spyders.

Due to safety concerns, especially by Helmut Marko, who called the race "totally insane", the last Targa Florio as a World Sportscar Championship race was run in 1973; when it had become impossible to retain its international status after a number of accidents, two of which were fatal; one which privateer Charles Blyth crashed his Lancia Fulvia HF into a trailer at the end of the Buonfornello straight and was killed; and another where an Italian driver crashed his Alpine-Renault into a group of spectators, killing one. There were several other accidents during practice for the 1973 event in which a total of seven spectators sustained injuries. The event was won by a Porsche 911 Carrera RSR as the prototypes such as Jacky Ickx's Ferrari suffered crashes or other troubles. 

The Targa's international demise was compounded because of widespread concern about the organizers' ability to properly maintain the race on such a massive circuit, and there were not enough marshals - most spectators sat too close to the roads; and also the international automotive governing body, the FIA, mandated safety walls on all circuits that were going to hold FIA-mandated events from 1974 onwards, and the  length of combined public roads made this simply impossible and totally impracticable, especially from a financial standpoint: the sport's growing professionalism was something the Targa's organizers simply could not keep up with. One example of this concern was when Briton Brian Redman crashed his Porsche 908/03 during the 1971 event 20 miles into the first lap. The steering on his car broke, and it hit a stone wall and caught fire. Redman had second-degree burns all over his body and it took 45 minutes for any medical help to reach Redman (while he was attended to by spectators who were trying to keep him cool by waving objects). The Porsche team did not know where he was for 12 hours until teammates Pedro Rodriguez and Richard Attwood found him in a local clinic. 

The Targa was continued as a national event for some years, before a crash in 1977 where hillclimbing specialist Gabriele Ciuti went off the road and crashed at the fast curves at the end of the Buonfornello straight after some of the bodywork flew off his BMW-powered Osella prototype. This accident killed 2 spectators and seriously injured 5 others (including Ciuti, who went into a coma, but survived), and effectively sealed the race's fate. After this accident the race was forcibly taken over by local police and was stopped on the 4th lap, and it also saw 2 other drivers having serious accidents; one of them was critically injured, but survived.

Although the Targa Florio was a rally-type race that took place on closed-off public mountain roads with (aside from straw bales and weak guardrails at some of the turns, the latter were installed by the island's government) practically no safety features, only 9 people – including spectators – died at the event over the 71 year and 61 race history using a total of 6 circuit configurations. This number is relatively small compared to other open road races, like the Mille Miglia, where over a period of 30 years and 24 races, 56 people lost their lives and the Carrera Panamericana, where over a period of 5 years and 5 races, 25 people were killed.

Legacy 
After winning the race several times, Porsche named the hardtop convertible version of the 911 after the Targa. The name targa means plaque or plate, see targa top.

The Australian-made Leyland P76 had a special version named Targa Florio to commemorate victory by journalist-rallyist Evan Green on a Special Stage of the 1974 London-Sahara-Munich World Cup Rally which was held on the Targa Florio course.

Since 1992 the event has lent its name to a modern recreation, staged half-a-world away in the form of the famous road rally Targa Tasmania held on the island state of Tasmania, off the Southern coast of Australia. There are also the Targa New Zealand since 1995, the Targa Newfoundland since 2002 and Targa Great Barrier Reef since 2018 where it is held in the Far North section of Queensland.

2017 will celebrate the 101st Anniversary of the Targa Florio and the first time the event has left Italy. This is an amazing attraction for Victoria, Australia and all car enthusiasts. The event, tours Victoria’s coast and countryside from November 29 to December 3 and features over 150 of the world’s most admirable cars and is expected to attract fans, celebrities and media from across the globe.

The Targa Florio Australian Tribute (TFAT - https://www.targaflorioaustralia.com/) is a regularity event for classic cars produced in the years between 1906 and 1976. Cars competed over 4 days on Victoria’s open roads at regulated speed. As part of the event there were 56 trials across the 4 days. The inaugural event was a huge success and was repeated in 2018. The 3rd Targa Florio Australian Tribute 2019 will be held in Melbourne, Victoria, Australia, from 27 November to 1 December 2019.

Winners

Races between 1955 and 1973 were part of the World Championship, with the 1957 race not a race but a regularity test following the Mille Miglia accident.

Wins by manufacturer

The list below includes all car manufacturers who have attained a podium. The table does not include the results of the 1957 edition, which was held as a regularity race.

See also 
List of automobile races in Italy
Targa Florio Rally

Further reading 

 Valenza, Giuseppe (2007). Targa Florio Il Mito: Legenda Editore (Italy). .

 Giuseppe Valenza (2018), "Targa Florio The Myth Anatomy of an Epic Race 1906-1973". G.Valenza. (Italy). .
 Giuseppe Valenza (2009) "Targa Florio Il Mito", Nigensha Publishing. Tokyo.  .

References

External links 

Targa Florio photos
 
Museo Targa Florio Collesano
Targa Florio History
Targappassionati 
Results, reports, photos etc.
Track maps
Fast laps
Porsche at Targa Florio
Targa Florio memorabilia
Museo Biblioteca Vincenzo Florio a Campofelice di Roccella - www.targaflorio-1906-1977.it
 http://www.targapedia.com
The full Targa Florio for GrandPrix Legends
 http://www.amicidellatargaflorio.com
Le Auto. Targa Florio, 1906 1977, Gallery of winners.
Sport-auto. Gallery of competitors 1906-1977
a sicilian dream
History of the Targa Florio

 
1906 establishments in Italy
1977 disestablishments in Italy
Sports car races
World Sportscar Championship races
Auto races in Italy
Recurring sporting events established in 1906
Recurring sporting events disestablished in 1977
20th century in Sicily